The 1999 Betty Barclay Cup doubles was the doubles event of the fifteenth edition of the Betty Barclay Cup, a WTA Tier II tournament held in Hamburg, Germany and part of the European claycourt season. Barbara Schett and Patty Schnyder were the defending champions but only Schett competed that year with Ruxandra Dragomir. The pair lost in the first round to Irina Spîrlea and Caroline Vis.

Second seeds Larisa Neiland and Arantxa Sánchez Vicario won in the final 6–2, 6–1 against Amanda Coetzer and Jana Novotná.

Seeds

Draw

Qualifying

Seeds

Qualifiers
  Sandra Načuk /  Sylvia Plischke

Qualifying draw

External links
 ITF tournament edition details

Betty Barclay Cup